The 1939 Wisconsin Badgers football team was an American football team that represented the University of Wisconsin in the 1939 Big Ten Conference football season. The team compiled a 1–6–1 record (0–5–1 against conference opponents) and finished in ninth place in the Big Ten Conference. Harry Stuhldreher was in his fourth year as Wisconsin's head coach.

Fullback George Paskvan was selected by the Associated Press and United Press as a first-team player on the 1939 All-Big Ten Conference football team. He was also selected as Wisconsin's most valuable player. Ralph Moeller was the team captain.

The team played its home games at Camp Randall Stadium, which had a capacity of 36,000. During the 1939 season, the average attendance at home games was 23,726.

Schedule

References

Wisconsin
Wisconsin Badgers football seasons
Wisconsin Badgers football